Cartiers Superfoods was a Kent based supermarket chain. Active from the early 1970s, until Tesco acquired the 17 outlets affiliated with Cartiers Superfoods in 1979 to increase its overall sales volume through larger stores. Stores were located in, among other places, Canterbury, Faversham, Herne Bay, Strood, Sittingbourne and Cliftonville.

Working on the 'Pile it High, Sell it Cheap' business model and selling a large range of frozen foods, Cartiers picked up on the growth of domestic chest freezers before most other retailers did. Many of the frozen food lines sold were of excellent quality but from little known local manufacturers which enabled lower pricing. Cartiers Superfoods's success led to the Tesco buyout. The Tesco store in Cliftonville is an original Cartiers store.

Various TV commercials were produced by Southern Television at their Dover studios, and on location at Cartiers Ashford superstore.

References

Defunct supermarkets of the United Kingdom